The 26th Cavalry Regiment (Philippine Scouts) (26th CAV (PS)) was part of U.S. Army Forces Far East's Philippine Department, during World War II.  The 26th engaged in the last cavalry charge in the history of the U.S. cavalry. The American Battle Monuments Commission list 301 dead who were members of this regiment interred at Manila American Cemetery and Memorial.

Formation 
The 26th Cavalry was formed in 1922, at Fort Stotsenburg, from elements of the 25th Field Artillery Regiment and the 43d Infantry Regiment (PS). The regiment was based there, with the exception of Troop F (which was based at Nichols Field). In addition to horse mounted troops, the regiment had a HQ Troop, machine gun troop, and a platoon of six Indiana White M1 scout cars, and trucks for transporting service elements. On 30 November 1941, the regiment had 787 enlisted men and 55 officers, and its commander was Col. (later BGen.) Clinton A. Pierce (USA).

World War II combat history

Northern and central Luzon

Following the 1941 Japanese invasion, the 26th participated in the Allied withdrawal to the Bataan Peninsula. In doing so, the unit conducted a classic delaying action that allowed other, less mobile, units to safely withdraw to the peninsula. During the delaying action the 26th provided the "stoutest" and only "serious opposition" to the Japanese; the majority of the units sent north towards Lingayen Gulf were divisions (11th, 21st, 71st, & 91st Infantry Divisions) of the untrained and poorly equipped Philippine Army. For instance, during the initial landings the regiment alone delayed the advance of four enemy infantry regiments for six hours at Damortis, and on 24 December repulsed a tank assault at Binalonan. However, the resistance was not without cost, as by the end of 24 December the regiment had been reduced to 450 men. Following these events, the regiment was pulled off the line and brought back up to a strength of 657 men, who in January 1942 held open the roadways to the Bataan Peninsula allowing other units to prepare for their stand there.

Bataan
The 26th Cavalry Regiment, consisting mostly of Philippine Scouts, was the last U.S. cavalry regiment to engage in horse-mounted warfare. When Troop G encountered Japanese forces at the village of Morong on 16 January 1942, Lieutenant Edwin P. Ramsey ordered the last cavalry charge in American history. It would not be until 22 October 2001, when American Soldiers would enter combat on horseback again, when members of the 12-man Operational Detachment Alpha 595 (Green Berets), accompanying members of the Afghanistan Northern Alliance, rode into battle at Cōbaki in Balkh Province.

During the retreat to Bataan, the 26th was heavily outnumbered by an infantry force supported by tanks. They drove off the surprised Japanese. Due to a shortage of food, they found it necessary to butcher their mounts and the regiment was converted to two squadrons, one a motorized rifle squadron, the other a mechanized squadron utilizing the remaining scout cars and Bren carriers.

Guerrilla activities

Following the delaying action down the central Luzon plain, Troop C was cut off from the rest of the regiment, having been ordered into Northern Luzon in an attempt to defend Baguio by Major General Wainwright in late December 1941.  In January 1942, the unit, with assistance from 71st Infantry and elements of the 11th Infantry, raided Tuguegarao Airfield, destroying several planes, and killing multiple Japanese soldiers. Eventually the unit was supplemented by other soldiers and guerrillas, and remained an effective fighting force well into 1943. The remnants of Troop C would later be integrated into the United States Army Forces in the Philippines – Northern Luzon, which due to deaths and captures would be led by Russell W. Volckmann. Other guerrilla organizations were led by officers of the regiment, who ignored the surrender orders, or by enlisted men who escaped from Bataan. However, those organizations did not have a direct connection to the regiment, as the Cagayan-Apayao Forces did.

The regiment was inactivated in 1946 and disbanded in 1951.

Decorations

See also
 Horses in World War II
 Military history of the Philippines during World War II

Notes

References

External links
26 Cav at philippine-scouts.org
 Edwin Price Ramsey Web site Lt. Ramsey led the cavalry charge at Morong, mentioned in this article.

Cavalry regiments of the United States Army
 
Military units and formations established in 1922
Military units and formations disestablished in 1951
United States Army regiments in World War II
American military personnel of Filipino descent